The Vietnam University of Fine Arts (formerly Hanoi College of Fine Arts) is an art school in Hanoi, Vietnam originally established under French colonial rule in 1925. The university has trained many of Vietnam’s leading artists and each year it participates in many cultural exchanges with sister institutions overseas.

History
The history of the Vietnam University of Fine Arts can be traced back to the colonial École des Beaux Arts de l’Indochine (1925–45) (the Indochina College of Fine Arts) which trained successive generations of Vietnamese students — and a smaller number of students from Cambodia and Laos — in the western art tradition, laying the groundwork for the development of a distinctive Vietnamese style of modern art. The École des Beaux-Arts de l’Indochine in Hanoi was the predecessor of the Hanoi College of Fine Arts (:vi:Trường Đại học Mỹ thuật Việt Nam).

The école was established by the French colonial government, along similar lines to the École Nationale des Beaux-Arts d’Alger, established 1843, and École des Beaux-Arts de Tunis, established 1923. The school was for all students who were then known to the French as Indochinese — including Tonkinese (Bắc Kỳ), Annamese (Trung Kỳ), Cochin Chinese (i.e., not ethnic Chinese but inhabitants of Nam Kỳ), Khmer, and Lao — although inevitably most students were drawn from Hanoi itself.

Directors and teachers 
The École des Beaux-Arts de l'Indochine was founded by the French academic and painter, Victor Tardieu and the Vietnamese artist, Nam Sơn.. Tardieu was awarded the Prix de l'Indochine and travelled to Indochina in 1920 where he was commissioned to paint murals for the Indochina University and the Central Library in Hanoi. Tardieu directed the École until his death in 1937, and was succeeded by the sculptor Évariste Jonchère who was director from 1938 to 1945. Nam Son was an Indochinese painter who received both a French and a Vietnamese education and became a civil servant in the French colonial government before continuing his artistic education at the École des Beaux-Arts in Paris. Nam Son taught decorative art until 1945 as the first Indochinese teacher at the École des Beaux-Arts de l'Indochine.

Many teachers at the school were winners of the Prix de l'Indochine, an annual award for French artists established by the French government to encourage painters to relocate to the colonies. From 1926, the award-winning artist was required to spend two years in Indochina on a study tour and a year of teaching at the École des Beaux-Arts de l'Indochine. Teachers included Joseph Inguimberty, and Alix Aymé, wife of the deputy commander of the French forces.

Alumni of the École des Beaux-Arts de l’Indochine 
Students included Lê Phổ,Vũ Cao Đàm, Tô Ngọc Vân, Nguyễn Phan Chánh, the first to exhibit silk paintings in Paris in 1931, Nguyễn Gia Trí, known for his lacquer painting, the Roman Catholic painter Lê Văn Đệ, Nguyễn Tường Lân, the painter Lê Thị Lựu who emigrated to Paris, Nguyễn Sáng, Nguyễn Khang (painter), Huỳnh Văn Gấm, Phan Kế An, Dương Bích Liên and Tạ Tỵ.

Curriculum of the École des Beaux-Arts de l'Indochine 
The curriculum aimed to combine Western and Eastern art traditions, and to train artists and teachers. Students took courses on drawing, linear perspective, open-air painting, and oil painting based on the curriculum at the École des Beaux-Arts in Paris.  The École contributed to introducing Western oil painting in Vietnam, which played a role in modern Vietnamese painting.

After 1945
The Musée Maurice Long across the street from the École des Beaux-Arts de l'Indochine was destroyed in the 1945 Japanese coup d'etat, and the École subsequently closed its doors. The École was taken over by the provisional government of the Democratic Republic of Vietnam after the August Revolution of 1945. When the struggle against the French intensified in 1950, the college was moved to Đại Từ, Thai Nguyen in the Viet Bac Resistance Zone, under the direction of painter Tô Ngọc Vân.

In 1954 professors and students returned to Hanoi where, in 1957, a new Hanoi College of Fine Art was established under the direction of painter Tran Van Can. 

Nguyễn Đỗ Cung, a student at the École des Beaux-Arts de l'Indochine from 1929-1934, founded the Museum of Fine Arts in 1963. 

In 1981 this institution became the Hanoi University of Fine Art. The university offers five-year Bachelor of Fine Art programmes and two-year full-time or three-year part-time Master of Arts programmes in Painting, Graphic Art and Sculpture, and four-year Bachelor of Fine Art Education programmes.

Alumni of Tô Ngọc Vân's Resistance Class 
Graduates who studied in the resistance zone under Tô Ngọc Vân included Trần Lưu Hậu.

Alumni of Hanoi College of Fine Arts (1957-1975) 
Graduates included Phạm Thanh Tâm, Phạm Đỗ Đồng and Bùi Quang Ánh.

References

Universities in Hanoi
Educational institutions established in 1925
1925 establishments in Vietnam